The eastern garter snake (Thamnophis sirtalis sirtalis) is a medium-sized snake indigenous to North America.

Taxonomy and etymology
The scientific name Thamnophis sirtalis sirtalis is a combination of Ancient Greek and New Latin that means "bush snake that looks like a garter strap". The generic name Thamnophis is derived from the Greek "thamnos" (bush) and "ophis" (snake) and the specific name sirtalis is derived from the New Latin "siratalis" (like a garter), a reference to the snake's color pattern resembling a striped garter strap.

Description 
Females are typically larger than males. They are either a greenish, brown, or black color and have a distinct yellow or white stripe.

Reproduction
Eastern garter snakes are ovoviviparous, giving birth to live young. Many males may try to mate with one female, resulting in a "breeding ball".

Distribution and habitat 
The eastern garter snake has a wide range across eastern North America, as far north as southern Ontario and Quebec to the Gulf of Mexico in the south, along the eastern shores of America to the Mississippi River. In New England, the snake is described as the "most widespread and ubiquitous" serpent, from wilderness to urban environments and from sea level to high elevations.

The eastern garter snake will live in a variety of environments, with a preference for grassy or shrubby fields, including abandoned farmland, outbuildings and trash dumps. In particular the snake likes to inhabit stone walls that separate the forest from fields. It is also found along moist habitats such as lakes, rivers, streams, swamps, bogs, ponds, drainage ditches, and quarries. Snakes are present in urban environments in habitats that include "city parks, cemeteries and suburban yards and gardens". Eastern garter snakes like to conceal themselves under logs, stones and other debris that allow them to bask in the sunlight and quickly seek refuge from predators. Krulikowski notes that "[o]ld poultry farms with discarded sheet-metal incubation trays provide warm, moist hiding places."

Feeding 
Eastern garter snakes mostly eat toads, frogs, slugs, and worms, but they will eat almost anything they can overpower.

The eastern garter snake is broadly considered non-venomous. Garter snakes do have a Duvernoy's gland, and the secretion from the gland may be chewed into prey during bites. The secretion is noted to cause hemorrhaging in mice and has produced non-allergic symptoms in at least one bite on a human.

References

External links
(Thamnophis sirtalis sirtalis), Ontario Nature

Colubrids
Reptiles described in 1758
Taxa named by Carl Linnaeus